Bonitos are a tribe of medium-sized, ray-finned predatory fish in the family Scombridae – a family it shares with the mackerel, tuna, and Spanish mackerel tribes, and also the butterfly kingfish.  Also called the tribe Sardini, it consists of eight species across four genera; three of those four genera are monotypic, having a single species each. Bonitos closely resemble the skipjack tuna, which is often called a bonito, especially in Japanese contexts.

Etymology 
The fish's name comes from the Spanish bonito 'pretty'. An older theory suggests that it comes from an Arabic word bainīth, but that may have been derived from Spanish as well.

Species 
 Genus Sarda (Cuvier, 1832)
 Australian bonito, S. australis (Macleay, 1881)
 Sarda chiliensis (Cuvier, 1832)
 Eastern Pacific bonito, S. c. chiliensis (Cuvier, 1832)
 Pacific bonito, S. c. lineolata (Girard, 1858)
 Striped bonito, S. orientalis (Temminck & Schlegel, 1844)
 Atlantic bonito, S. sarda (Bloch, 1793)
 Genus Cybiosarda (Whitley, 1935)
 Leaping bonito, C. elegans (Whitley, 1935)
 Genus Gymnosarda Gill, 1862
 Dogtooth tuna, G. unicolor (Rüppell, 1836)
 Genus Orcynopsis Gill, 1862
 Plain bonito, O. unicolor (Geoffroy Saint-Hilaire, 1817)

Food
Pacific and Atlantic bonito meat has a firm texture and a darkish color. The bonito has a moderate fat content. The meat of young or small bonito can be of light color, close to that of skipjack tuna, and is sometimes used as a cheap substitute for skipjack, especially for canning purposes, and occasionally in the production of cheap varieties of katsuobushi that are sold as bonito flakes.  Bonito may not, however, be marketed as tuna in all countries. The Atlantic bonito is also found in the Mediterranean and the Black Sea, where it is a popular food fish, eaten grilled, pickled (lakerda), or baked.

See also

 Other fish sometimes called "bonito" include skipjack tuna, Katsuwonus pelamis

References

Citations

Sources 

 

Scombridae
Taxa named by David Starr Jordan